Hedi Gharbi (born August 5, 1969) is a Tunisian sailor. He and Rihab Hammami placed 20th in the Nacra 17 event at the 2016 Summer Olympics.

References

1969 births
Living people
Tunisian male sailors (sport)
Olympic sailors of Tunisia
Sailors at the 2016 Summer Olympics – Nacra 17